Mirza Nazeer Baig (born 19 July 1941), also known by his screen name Nadeem  is a Pakistani actor, singer and producer. He has appeared in over two hundred films and has won the 1997 Pride of Performance award. In Pakistan Nadeem enjoys the same status as Amitabh Bachchan enjoys in India.

Early life
Baig was born in Vijayawada in modern Andhra Pradesh which, in 1941, was part of Madras Presidency in British India. Nadeem Baig migrated to Dhaka, East Pakistan along with his family after the independence of Pakistan in 1947. He finished his high school at Sindh Madrasa-tul-Islam and attended some years of college at Government Islamia Science College, Karachi before he entered the Pakistani film industry.

Nadeem, along with artistes Talat Hussain, M. Zaheer Khan, Aftab Azeem, Saleem Jafry, and TV producer Iqbal Haider, were all discovered at a club in Karachi in the 1960s. He and his friends, Ameer Ahmed Khan and Qasim Siddiqui, won several music competitions. At one of those musical competitions, he was noticed by singer Ferdausi Rahman. She was impressed by his singing talent and encouraged him to try playback singing in Dhaka's film industry.

Career
Nadeem's film career spans more than 50 years. He started his career in 1967 and appeared in his first film Chakori (1967) in a leading role with actress Shabana. The film was produced and directed by Captain Ehtesham, who, in real life, became his father-in-law in 1968 when Nadeem married Farzana, Ehtesham's daughter. The film did well in both circuits of Pakistani film industry, i.e., West and East Pakistan. He won a Nigar Award in the best actor's category for Chakori. Nadeem's films include Nadan (1973), Anari, Pehchan (1975), Talash (1976), Aina (1977), Hum Dono (1980), Lajawab, Qurbani (1981), Sangdil (1982), and Dehleez (1983). He made a popular screen pairing with actress Shabnam with whom he acted in most of his films.  Besides acting, Nadeem has sung many songs for films. Nadeem has worked with veteran film directors of Pakistani film industry including Pervez Malik, Nazrul Islam, S. Suleman, Shamim Ara, Sangeeta and Samina Peerzada. Among the well-known actors, he has worked with Santosh Kumar, Darpan, Waheed Murad, Allauddin and Syed Kamal over his long career.

Playback singers
In his career, Nadeem is mostly voiced by Ahmed Rushdi and latter Akhlaq Ahmed provided his voice. He himself acknowledged that songs in Rushdi's voice made his work easier and played a significant role in his success.

Selected filmography

 Chakori (1967) (Nadeem's debut film)
 Behan Bhai (1968)
 Diya Aur Toofan (1969)
 Daman Aur Chingari (1973)
 Aina (1977)
 Bandish (1980)
 Dillagi (1974)
 Shama (1974)
 Phool Mere Gulshan Ka (1974)
 Anari (1975)
 Jab Jab Phool Khile (1975)
 Pehchan (1975)
 Umang
 Naadan
 Chote Sahab
 Daagh
 Mutthi Bhar Chawal (1978)
 Amber (1978)
 Pakeeza (1979)
 Dehleez (1983)
 Doordesh (1983)
 Mukhra (1988) - a film produced by Nadeem Baig also
 Bulandi (1990)
 Anhoni (1993)
 Sargam (1995)
 Jeeva (1995)
 Jo Darr Gaya Woh Mar Gaya (1995)
 Umar Mukhtar (1997)
 Dupatta Jal Raha Hai (1998)
 Inteha (1999)
 Koi Tujh Sa Kahan (2005)
 Mein Ek Din Laut Kay Aaoon Ga (2007)
 Love Mein Gum (2011)
 Main Hoon Shahid Afridi (2013)
 The System (2014)
 Hijrat (2016)
 Sikander (2016)
 Shaan-e-Ishq (2017)
 Superstar (2019)
 Parey Hut Love (2019)
 Zarrar (2020)
 Tere Bajre Di Rakhi (2022)

Television

Awards and recognition
 Nigar Award for a total of 16 times between 1967 and 2002 as an actor including the Nigar Award Millennium Award in 1999
 Pride of Performance Award by the President of Pakistan in 1997

Lux Style Awards

See also 
 List of Lollywood actors

References

External links
 
 (Filmography of Nadeem Baig on IMDb website)

1941 births
Living people
Male actors from Vijayawada
Muhajir people
Indian male film actors
Pakistani male film actors
Pakistani male television actors
Pakistani television directors
Nigar Award winners
Recipients of the Pride of Performance
Male actors from Karachi
Singers from Karachi
Male actors in Urdu cinema
21st-century Indian actors